FSIA may refer to:
Food Safety Institute of the Americas
Foreign Sovereign Immunities Act
Seychelles International Airport, its ICAO airport code